Sandgates On Cat Creek is a historic home located at Oakville, St. Mary's County, Maryland.  It is a -story, three-bay frame structure with brick ends built between 1740 and 1780.  It is one of the best and most authentic restorations in Southern Maryland.

It was listed on the National Register of Historic Places in 1978.

References

External links
, including undated photo, at Maryland Historical Trust

Houses on the National Register of Historic Places in Maryland
Houses in St. Mary's County, Maryland
Houses completed in 1750
Historic American Buildings Survey in Maryland
National Register of Historic Places in St. Mary's County, Maryland